Oliver Lukas Dozae Nnonyelu Dovin (born 11 July 2002) is a Swedish professional footballer who plays as a goalkeeper for Hammarby IF in Allsvenskan.

Early life
Dovin was born in London, United Kingdom, to a British Nigerian father and a Swedish mother. He moved to Stockholm, Sweden, together with his family at age one.

He began playing football as a youngster with local club Enskede IK. In 2014, at age 12, Dovin joined the youth academy of Allsvenskan club Hammarby IF.

Club career

Hammarby IF
On 16 August 2018, Dovin signed his first professional contract with Hammarby running until the end of 2021. He appeared as an unused substitute in eight Allsvenskan fixtures in 2019, behind both Johan Wiland and Davor Blažević, as Hammarby finished 3rd in the table.

On 6 December 2020, Dovin made his senior debut in Allsvenskan, in a 1–2 away loss against Örebro SK, the last fixture of the season. He later signed a new long-term deal with Hammarby, running until the summer of 2024.

On 30 May 2021, Dovin won the 2020–21 Svenska Cupen, the main domestic cup, with Hammarby through a 5–4 win on penalties (0–0 after full-time) against BK Häcken in the final. Dovin made three appearances as the side reached the play-off round of the 2021–22 UEFA Europa Conference League, after eliminating Maribor (4–1 on aggregate) and FK Čukarički (6–4 on aggregate), where the club was knocked out by Basel on penalties (4–4 on aggregate).

International career
Dovin was part of the Swedish squad for the 2019 UEFA European Under-17 Championship, where he made 30 saves across three games (the best record among goalkeepers in the whole tournament). On 3 June 2021, Dovin made his debut for the Swedish U21’s, playing one half in a 2–0 friendly win against Finland. He made his full international debut for Sweden on 12 January 2023, appearing in the second half as a replacement for Jacob Widell Zetterström in a friendly 2–1 win against Iceland. Thus, Dovin also became the first ever goalkeeper born in the 21st century to represent the Swedish national team.

Career statistics

Club

International

Honours
Hammarby IF
 Svenska Cupen: 2020–21

References

External links

2002 births
Living people
Footballers from Greater London
Swedish footballers
Sweden youth international footballers
Sweden international footballers
English footballers
Swedish people of English descent
Swedish people of Nigerian descent
English people of Swedish descent
English people of Nigerian descent
English emigrants to Sweden
People with acquired Swedish citizenship
Association football goalkeepers
Hammarby Fotboll players
IK Frej players
Hammarby Talang FF players
Allsvenskan players
Ettan Fotboll players